On Heroes and Tombs is a novel by Argentine writer Ernesto Sabato (1911–2011), first published in Buenos Aires  in 1961 and translated by Helen R. Lane in 1981.

Plot summary
Nineteen-year-old Martín Castillo is a boy from Buenos Aires trying to find his path in life. He meets and falls in love with Alejandra Vidal Olmos, who with her father Fernando represents the "old", post-colonial and autochthonous Argentina, which is seen mutating amid a strange and unsettling "new" world. The novel gives an evocative portrait of the city of Buenos Aires and its people.

Literary significance and criticism
This work, filled with dark and emotional imagery, is considered by many to be Sabato's magnum opus, and the section Informe sobre ciegos ("Report on the Blind"), about Fernando's distorted obsession with, and fear of, the blind, is a haunting, nightmarish contribution to Latin American literature.

References to actual history, geography and current science
Interspersed with the text of the novel, as an almost surrealistic running commentary on it, is the italicised narrative of the flight, killing and ensuing odyssey of Juan Lavalle, a classic Argentine subject.

Cultural influence
John Malkovich has optioned the film rights for this novel.

Swedish melodic death metal band At the Gates' album At War with Reality has lyrics based on this book. Its intro is a quote from this book.

1961 Argentine novels
Novels by Ernesto Sabato
Novels set in Buenos Aires